Derrick Peterson (born November 28, 1977, in Waycross, Georgia) is a retired American middle-distance runner who specialized in the 800 meters. He represented the US at the 2004 Summer Olympics . He won the silver medal in the event at the 2001 Summer Universiade and the bronze at the 1999 Summer Universiade.

He was the assistant coach of long sprints and hurdles at his alma mater, the University of Missouri from 2006 to 2012. He is currently an assistant cross country/track and field coach at DePaul University

Competition record

Personal bests
Outdoor
800 meters – 1:45.08 (Sacramento 2004)
1000 meters – 2:18 
Indoor
800 meters – 1:45.88 (Indianapolis 1999)
1000 meters – 2:19.82 (Boston 2002)
Cross Country
10,000 meters - 32.52.80 (NCAA Champs)

References

1977 births
Living people
American male middle-distance runners
Athletes (track and field) at the 2004 Summer Olympics
Olympic track and field athletes of the United States
People from Waycross, Georgia
Missouri Tigers men's track and field athletes
Missouri Tigers men's cross country runners
Missouri Tigers track and field coaches
DePaul Blue Demons track and field coaches
DePaul Blue Demons cross country coaches
Universiade medalists in athletics (track and field)
Universiade silver medalists for the United States
Universiade bronze medalists for the United States
Medalists at the 1999 Summer Universiade
Medalists at the 2001 Summer Universiade
20th-century American people